Jean Breuls van Tiecken (10 January 1899 – 8 July 1967) was a Belgian equestrian. He competed in two events at the 1924 Summer Olympics.

References

External links
 

1899 births
1967 deaths
Belgian male equestrians
Olympic equestrians of Belgium
Equestrians at the 1924 Summer Olympics
Sportspeople from Liège